Auray (French: Gare d'Auray) is a railway station in Auray, Brittany, France. The station was opened on 21 September 1862 is located at kilometric point (KP) 584.946 on the Savenay–Landerneau railway. The station is also the starting point for the Auray–Quiberon railway and Auray–Pontivy railway. The station was built by the operator of the Paris - Orleans railway line. Today, the station is served by TGV (high speed), Intercités (long distance) and TER (local) services operated by the SNCF. The line to Pontivy was opened in December 1864, and the line to Quiberon was opened in July 1882. The Auray - Pontivy railway line closed to passenger traffic in October 1949, and is now only used to transport freight. The station is 2 km north-west of the centre of Auray.

Train services

The station is served by high speed trains to Quimper and Paris, and regional trains to Quimper, Vannes, Nantes and Rennes. In summer there is a train service to Quiberon.

References

External links

Auray-Quiberon timetable

Railway stations in Morbihan
TER Bretagne
Railway stations in France opened in 1862